Glushkovo is an urban locality (an urban-type settlement) in Glushkovsky District of Kursk Oblast, Russia.  In the 19th century the village was an administrative center of Glushkovskaya volost, Rylsky Uyezd, Kursk Governorate. Population:

References

Urban-type settlements in Kursk Oblast